This is a list of number-one hit singles in 1966 in New Zealand, starting with the first chart dated, 25 March 1966.

Chart

References
 

1966 in New Zealand
1966 record charts
1966
1960s in New Zealand music